The  American Journal of Psychology  is a journal devoted primarily to experimental psychology.  It is the first such journal to be published in the English language (though Mind, founded in 1876, published some experimental psychology earlier). AJP was founded by the Johns Hopkins University psychologist Granville Stanley Hall in 1887.  This quarterly journal has distributed several groundbreaking papers in psychology . The AJP investigates the science of behavior and the mind, releasing reports of original research based on experimental psychology, theoretical presentations, combined theoretical and experimental analyses, historical commentaries, and detailed reviews of well-known books.

Abstracting and indexing 
The journal is abstracted and indexed in Academic ASAP, JSTOR, BIOSIS, and Scopus.

References

External links

English-language journals
Experimental psychology journals
Publications established in 1887
University of Illinois Press academic journals
Quarterly journals